Katnosa is a regulated lake in Nordmarka, Norway bordering to the municipalities Lunner, Jevnaker and Ringerike. It drains through the river Katnoselva to the lakes Store Sandungen, Hakkloa, Bjørnsjøen and Skjærsjøen. It is regulated by the dam Katnosdammen from 1886. Katnosa is part of the Spålen–Katnosa Nature Reserve.

References

Lakes of Viken (county)
Reservoirs in Norway